SS Adolph Woermann was a German steam ocean liner built in 1922 by Blohm & Voss in Hamburg for the shipping lines Woermann-Linie (WL) and German East Africa Line (Deutsche Ostafrika Linie, DOAL) and named after German merchant, ship owner and politician Adolph Woermann, and the fourth ship of the same name.

Details
Adolph Woermann was an oil-fuelled steamship. She had a set of four Blohm & Voss steam turbines that drove a single screw via single reduction gearing. Her code letters were RDBH until 1933–34, when they were superseded by the call sign DHAK.

Peacetime service
Adolph Woermann ran aground at Cape Spartivento, Sardinia, Italy, on 24 October 1928. She was refloated on 26 October 1928.

In the early 1930s the future jazz pianist and composer Charles Segal and future actor Laurence Harvey were passengers on Adolph Woermann from Hamburg to Cape Town when their mothers, who were half-sisters, emigrated taking their children from Lithuania to South Africa.

Second World War
At the outbreak of World War II Adolph Woermann was at Lobito in Portuguese Angola on a homeward voyage. Portuguese authorities detained her but on 16 November 1939 she left Lobito disguised as the Portuguese ship Nyassa to try to reach South America.

The UK refrigerated cargo liner  traced Adolph Woermann and alerted the Royal Navy light cruiser . When Neptune approached on 22 November, Adolph Woermanns Master, Otto Burfeind, evacuated his ship and scuttled her according to standing orders.

Crew and passengers were rescued in a friendly manner by the Neptunes crew. It is reported that one Neptune crew member was injured in trying to save the liner by going aboard to close the seacocks. Passengers and crew of Adolph Woermann were taken to England and interned at Seaton, Devon.

In 1940 most of the internees from Seaton, including Captain Burfeind and his crew, were put aboard  to be transferred to Canada. On 2 July 1940 the  torpedoed Arandora Star. Burfeind remained aboard, helping to organise Arandora Stars evacuation, until she sank and he was lost.

References

Bibliography

1922 ships
Ships built in Hamburg
Steamships of Germany
Passenger ships of Germany
Maritime incidents in 1928
World War II passenger ships of Germany
Maritime incidents in November 1939
World War II shipwrecks in the Atlantic Ocean